Yuanquan is a railway station on the Taiwan Railways Administration Jiji line located in Ershui Township, Changhua County, Taiwan.

History
The station was opened on 14 January 1922.

See also
 List of railway and metro stations in Taiwan

References

External links

1922 establishments in Taiwan
Railway stations in Changhua County
Railway stations opened in 1922
Railway stations served by Taiwan Railways Administration